Alexander Caldwell Davidson (December 26, 1826 – November 6, 1897) was a U.S. Representative from Alabama.

Born near Charlotte, North Carolina, Davidson attended the public schools of Marengo County, Alabama, and graduated from the University of Alabama at Tuscaloosa on July 11, 1848. He studied law in Mobile, Alabama, but never practiced. He engaged in cotton planting near Uniontown, Alabama. Davidson served as member of the Alabama House of Representatives in 1880 and 1881 and in the Alabama Senate from 1882 through 1885.

Davidson was elected as a Democrat to the Forty-ninth and Fiftieth United States Congresses (March 4, 1885 – March 3, 1889). He was an unsuccessful candidate for renomination in 1888 and resumed agricultural pursuits.

He died at "Westwood," near Uniontown, Alabama on November 6, 1897. His body was interred in the Holy Cross Cemetery of Davidson Memorial Church, Uniontown, Alabama.

References

External links

1826 births
1897 deaths
Politicians from Charlotte, North Carolina
Democratic Party members of the Alabama House of Representatives
Democratic Party Alabama state senators
Democratic Party members of the United States House of Representatives from Alabama
People from Marengo County, Alabama
University of Alabama alumni
People from Uniontown, Alabama
19th-century American politicians